"The Ride" is a 1994 song by Swedish band Basic Element, featuring new singer Saunet Sparell and released as the first single from their second album, The Ultimate Ride (1995). It was very successful in Scandinavia, peaking at number two in both Sweden and Finland, and number five in Denmark. On the Eurochart Hot 100, it reached a respectable number 20. A music video was produced to promote the single, featuring Sparell as a villain that has kidnapped the guys of the band and is transporting them to somewhere on a speedboat.

Single track listing

Charts

Weekly charts

Year-end charts

References

 

1994 songs
1994 singles
English-language Swedish songs
EMI Records singles
Eurodance songs
Songs written by Stefan Andersson (singer)